Putani Agent 123 is a 1979 Kannada children's film directed by Geethapriya. Master Rama Krishna Hegde and Master Bhanu Prakash played the lead roles in the movie along with the hit pair Srinath-Manjula. This film is regularly screened in children film festivals even in the 21st century. The film was dubbed in Hindi as Agent 123.

Cast 
 Srinath
 Manjula
 Ambareesh
 Master Ramakrishna Hegde
 Master Bhanu Prakash
 Baby Indira
 Udaya Kumar
 Shakti Prasad
 Sundar Krishna Urs
 Tiger Prabhakar
 M. S. Umesh

Soundtrack
"Putaani Agent 123" - S. P. Balasubrahmanyam, S. Janaki, Rajeshwari
"Yeno Santhosha" - S. P. Balasubrahmanyam, S. Janaki
"Sahyaadri Saalinale" - S. Janaki

References 

1979 films
1970s Kannada-language films
Films scored by Rajan–Nagendra
Indian children's films
Films directed by Geethapriya